Major-General David John Malcolm Jenkins CB CBE (born 2 January 1945) is a retired British Army officer and a former Master-General of the Ordnance.

Military career 
Jenkins was commissioned into the Queen's Own Hussars in 1965.

In 1994, he became Commandant of the Royal Military College of Science. Then in 1996 he was appointed Director-General for Land Systems and in 1998 he became an Executive Director at the Defence Procurement Agency and Master-General of the Ordnance. He retired in 2000.

He was appointed colonel of the Royal Electrical and Mechanical Engineers in 1997 He was then briefly Colonel Commandant of the Royal Armoured Corps in 1999, before becoming Colonel of the Queen's Royal Hussars later in the year.

In retirement, he became Under-Treasurer at Gray's Inn.

References 

|-
 

Companions of the Order of the Bath
Commanders of the Order of the British Empire
Queen's Own Hussars officers
British Army major generals
Living people
1945 births
Military personnel from Staffordshire